The electoral ward of Fairwood, City and County of Swansea, Wales, UK consists of some or all of the following areas: Dunvant, Upper Killay, Poundffald and Three Crosses in the parliamentary constituency of Gower.

The ward is bounded by the wards of Gower and Pennard to the south west; Penclawdd to the north west; Gowerton to the north east; Dunvant and Killay to the east; Mayals to the south west and Bishopston to the south.

The village of Upper Killay is located in the Fairwood ward about 3.5 miles west of Swansea City Centre.

Local council elections
In the Swansea local council elections for 2012, the voter turnout in Fairwood was 49.72%.  The results of voting were:

The Conservatives have held the Fairwood ward since 1995 and Paxton Hood-Williams has been councillor since 2004.

References

Gower Peninsula
Swansea electoral wards